Swanport Bridge is a road bridge that carries Highway 1 across the Murray River, located approximately  southeast of the town of Murray Bridge in South Australia, Australia. Opened on 30 May 1979 by transport minister Geoff Virgo, the bridge connects the communities of Murray Bridge and Tailem Bend.

Characteristics
It is constructed from prestressed concrete. There is a footpath on the northern side, with no barrier from the roadway, signposted as being for emergency use only. 

The bridge serves as a link between the South Eastern Freeway to the west and the Princes Highway continuing to the east, and as such is an integral part of the Adelaide–Melbourne road transport corridor. The bridge was originally intended to be a four lane bridge but to save costs only a two lane bridge was built. The bridge itself is only one lane each way with no median strip, and has a speed limit of  since 2015.

References

Bridges completed in 1979
Road bridges in South Australia
Concrete bridges in Australia
Crossings of the Murray River
1979 establishments in Australia